Läroverket för gossar och flickor, (eng. The educational institution for boys and girls) also known as Brobergska samskolan or Broban, was a Swedish school that operated in Helsinki 1883–1973. The school was the first co-educational school in Finland. The author and artist Tove Jansson, creator of Moomin, went to Läroverket för gossar och flickor.

History 
Läroverket för gossar och flickor was founded in 1883 by Professor Fridolf Gustafsson, assessor Uno Kurtén and assisting professorin Georg Asp. The school was originally called Helsingfors lärovärk för gossar och flickor, but the name was officially changed to Läroverket för gossar och flickor in 1912. Karl Theodor Broberg was headmaster 1883–1900, and the school was unofficially called Brobergska skolan (eng. Broberg's school) or "Broban" after him.

Läroverket för gossar och flickor offered nine educational levels, and from 1889 the students could complete the matriculation examination and thereby qualify for entry into university. The school therefore broke new ground, since this opened the door for girls to graduate and continue their studies at a university. The school followed a curriculum with special emphasis until the Russification of Finland (1899-1905) when all school curricula were aligned.

The school operated at various addresses in central Helsinki until 1895, when it moved in to its own building at Korkeavuorenkatu 23, where the Design Museum is now located. 

In 1973, Läroverket för gossar och flickor merged with Laguska skolan and formed Minervaskolan. In 1975, the new school was merged with Tölö Svenska samskola (Zillen) and closed two years later when the Finnish school system was reformed in 1977. The pupils were moved to Lönnbäckska skolan and Lönnbäckska gymnasiet.

Famous alumni 

 Emil Fabritius, architect and sports shooter
 Greta Hällfors-Sipilä, artist
 Tove Jansson, author, illustrator, artist
 Viktor Jansson, sculptor
 Ruben Lagus, military, general major
 Tor Nessling, industrialist
 Gunnar Nordström, physicist 
 Michael Widenius, software programmer

Headmasters 

 1883-1900 Karl Theodor Broberg
 1900-1905 J.M. Granit
 1905-1917 Jakob Einar Meinander
 1917-1925 Rolf Krogerus
 1925-1944 Fritiof Freudenthal
 1944-1947 Torsten Steinby
 1947-1968 Eric W. Nyström
 1968-1973 Hilding August Karling
 1973-1977 Margareta Grigorkoff (after the merger with other schools)

References 

Educational institutions disestablished in 1973
Educational institutions established in 1883
Schools in Helsinki
1883 establishments in the Russian Empire
Tove Jansson
Swedish-speaking population of Finland